Filipe José Machado (13 March 1984 – 28 November 2016) was a Brazilian footballer who last played for Chapecoense as a central defender.

Machado was one of the victims when LaMia Airlines Flight 2933 crashed on 28 November 2016.

Club career
Born in Gravataí, Rio Grande do Sul, Machado represented Internacional as a youth but made his senior debut while on loan at Fluminense. He also played the first half of the 2005 season for Esportivo, again on loan.

On 8 August 2006, Machado left for Spanish club Pontevedra CF in Segunda División B. He was an undisputed starter as his club finished first in its group, but failed to achieve promotion in the play-offs.

In the summer of 2007 Machado joined Portuguese club U.D. Leiria, but after altercations with the club's manager, he left for Bulgarian club CSKA Sofia. Machado appeared in 37 matches for the club, contributing with 2 goals. He also scored the winning goal for CSKA Sofia against Levski Sofia in the Eternal Derby during their first meeting of the 2007-08 A PFG season. He stayed there until August 2009, contributing to the club's record 31st league title.

As a free agent, and following a trial period, Machado signed a 1+2-year contract with Serie B side Salernitana in August 2009. He was released in January 2010, and claiming to have unpaid wages.

Machado switched teams and countries again ahead of the 2010–11 campaign, joining Azerbaijani club FC Inter Baku. In February 2011 he moved to the United Arab Emirates for Al Dhafra SCC, but appeared rarely.

Machado returned to Brazil in the 2011 summer, joining Duque de Caxias. He subsequently represented Resende and Guaratinguetá before moving abroad again to join Al-Fujairah SC in September 2012.

On 2 January 2014, Machado joined Macaé Esporte, helping the club in its Campeonato Brasileiro Série C winning campaign.

In the summer of 2015 he joined Persian Gulf Pro League side Saba Qom. On 10 May of the following year he returned to his homeland, signing for Chapecoense.

Machado became a first-choice upon arriving at Chape, and scored his first goal on 6 October 2016 in a 1–3 away loss against Atlético Paranaense. In his last match on 27 November, he was handed the captain armband in a 0–1 away loss against Palmeiras.

Death

Machado was one of 71 fatalities on 28 November 2016, when Chapecoense were en route to the first leg of the 2016 Copa Sudamericana Finals to play against Atlético Nacional in Medellín. Shortly before the take off, he recorded a video to his official Instagram account, showing all the players and the staff inside the plane.

Following the tragic accident, Machado's former club CSKA Sofia announced that part of the ticket revenue from their upcoming Bulgarian First League fixture against Pirin Blagoevgrad would be donated to Machado's family. CSKA Sofia supporters also gathered to pay tribute to Machado and his Chapecoense teammates in front of the Brazilian embassy in Sofia, Bulgaria.

Career statistics

Honours
CSKA Sofia
Bulgarian A Football Group: 2007–08
Bulgarian Supercup: 2008

Inter Baku
Azerbaijan Premier League: 2009–10

Macaé
Campeonato Brasileiro Série C: 2014

Chapecoense
 Copa Sudamericana: 2016 (posthumously)

References

External links

1984 births
2016 deaths
Sportspeople from Rio Grande do Sul
Naturalised citizens of Italy
Brazilian footballers
Association football fullbacks
Campeonato Brasileiro Série A players
Campeonato Brasileiro Série B players
Campeonato Brasileiro Série C players
Sport Club Internacional players
Fluminense FC players
Duque de Caxias Futebol Clube players
Resende Futebol Clube players
Guaratinguetá Futebol players
Macaé Esporte Futebol Clube players
Associação Chapecoense de Futebol players
Segunda División B players
Pontevedra CF footballers
First Professional Football League (Bulgaria) players
PFC CSKA Sofia players
Serie B players
U.S. Salernitana 1919 players
Azerbaijan Premier League players
Shamakhi FK players
UAE First Division League players
UAE Pro League players
Al Dhafra FC players
Fujairah FC players
Persian Gulf Pro League players
Saba players
Brazilian expatriate footballers
Expatriate footballers in Spain
Expatriate footballers in Bulgaria
Expatriate footballers in Italy
Expatriate footballers in Azerbaijan
Expatriate footballers in the United Arab Emirates
Expatriate footballers in Iran
Brazilian expatriate sportspeople in Spain
Brazilian expatriate sportspeople in Bulgaria
Brazilian expatriate sportspeople in Italy
Brazilian expatriate sportspeople in Azerbaijan
Brazilian expatriate sportspeople in the United Arab Emirates
Brazilian expatriate sportspeople in Iran
Brazilian emigrants to Italy
Footballers killed in the LaMia Flight 2933 crash